That's All may refer to:

Albums
 That's All (Bobby Darin album), 1959
 That's All (Mel Tormé album), 1965
 That's All (Tete Montoliu album), 1985
 That's All!, by Sammy Davis Jr., 1967
 That's All, by Twice as Much, 1968

Songs
 "That's All" (1938 song), by Sister Rosetta Tharpe; a cover of "Denomination Blues" by Washington Phillips (1927)
 "That's All" (1952 song), written by Alan Brandt and Bob Haymes; first recorded by Nat King Cole (1953), covered by many performers
 "That's All" (Genesis song), 1983
 "That's All" (Merle Travis song), 1947
 "That's All", by Mr and Mrs Smith and Mr Drake from Mr and Mrs Smith and Mr Drake, 1984